Jon Applebaum (born February 13, 1985) is a financial professional and former attorney and American politician, who was a member of the Minnesota House of Representatives. A member of the Minnesota Democratic–Farmer–Labor Party (DFL), he represented District 44B in the western Twin Cities metropolitan area. He was elected Deputy Minority Leader and served in that capacity from 2017-2019.

Early life
Applebaum grew up in Minnetonka, Minnesota and graduated from Hopkins High School. He attended Vanderbilt University, graduating with a bachelor's degree, and later the University of Minnesota, graduating with a J.D.

Minnesota House of Representatives
Applebaum was first elected to the Minnesota House of Representatives in 2014.

Personal life
Applebaum is married to his wife, Kate Fischer. They reside in Minnetonka, Minnesota.

References

External links

1985 births
Living people
Democratic Party members of the Minnesota House of Representatives
People from Minnetonka, Minnesota
21st-century American politicians